Stevan Živković (born January 2, 1988) is a Serbian welterweight kickboxer.

Biography and career
After winning the silver medal at the WAKO European Championship '10 he challenged French, Frederik Fise for WAKO Pro European Full-Contact Rules Middleweight Title in France on 28 May 2011, losing the fight via TKO in round 6, though leading on scoring cards until then.

Following his silver medal at W.A.K.O. World Championship '11 he got another opportunity to revanche Khasan Khaliev for WAKO Pro World Low-Kick Rules Middleweight Title in Grozny, Russia on 14 January 2012. He lost the fight by points just like in World Championship final.

Being the member of Serbian national team, he fought at WAKO Pro World Grand Prix. Started tournament with a loss due to a cut in quarter finals to Nikos Papadimitriou, but then scored two victories against Mihai Barbu and Konstantin Serebrianikov at the final on 16 June 2012 in Belgrade. Following those victories Serbia won the tournament.

In 2013 he scored two decision victories in Final Fight Championship promotion, on 25 October surprising victory over Miran Fabjan in -81 kg category at FFC08: Zelg vs. Rodriguez, and victory over Grega Smole in -77 category at FFC09: McSweeney vs. Traunmuller in Ljubljana, Slovenia on 15 November.

Titles

Kickboxing
 Professional
 2015 WAKO Pro European Low-Kick Rules Super Middleweight Champion -78.1 kg
 2012 Wins WAKO Pro World Grand Prix 2011 championship 
 Amateur
 2013 W.A.K.O. World Championship  -81 kg 
 2013 Serbia Open Cup Champion -81 kg 
 2012 W.A.K.O. European Championship  -75 kg 
 2012 Serbia Open Cup Champion -75 kg 
 2011 W.A.K.O. World Championship  -75 kg 
 2010 W.A.K.O. European Championship  -75 kg 
 2010 Serbia Open Cup Champion -75 kg 
 2007,8,9,10,11,12 Serbian Kickboxing Champion

Kickboxing record

|-
|-  bgcolor="FFBBBB"
| 2015-11-27 || Loss ||align=left| Eyevan Dunnenberg || FFC21: Rijeka  || Rijeka, Croatia || Decision (Unanimous) || 3 ||3:00
|-
|-  bgcolor= "#CCFFCC"
| 2015-09-18 || Win||align=left| Henry Bannert  || FFC 19 - Linz || Linz, Austria || TKO || 2 || 2:00
|-
|-  bgcolor="CCFFCC"
| 2015-06-19 || Win ||align=left| Angel Valdivielso  || Naissus Fight Night || Niš, Serbia || Decision (Majority) || 5 || 3:00
|-
! style=background:white colspan=9 |
|-
|-  bgcolor="CCFFCC"
| 2015-04-11 || Win ||align=left| Manuel Romero || Emil Frey Fighting Challenge  || Martigny, Switzerland || Decision (Unanimous) || 3 || 3:00
|-
|-  bgcolor="FFBBBB"
| 2014-12-06 || Loss ||align=left| Grigor Ashughbabyan || FFC 16: Vienna || Vienna, Austria || Decision (Unanimous) || 3 ||3:00
|-
|-  bgcolor="FFBBBB"
| 2014-04-04 || Loss ||align=left| Shkodran Veseli || FFC11: Jurković vs. Kaluđerović || Osijek, Croatia || KO (Flying knee) || 3 || 1:14
|-
|-  bgcolor="CCFFCC"
| 2014-03-19 || Win ||align=left| Cheick Sidibé || Tatneft Arena World Cup 2014 4th selection 1/8 final (-81 kg)  || Kazan, Russia || Ext. R. Decision || 4 ||3:00
|-
|-  bgcolor="CCFFCC"
| 2013-11-15 || Win ||align=left| Grega Smole || FFC09: McSweeney vs. Traunmuller || Ljubljana, Slovenia ||Decision (Unanimous) || 3 ||3:00
|-
|-  bgcolor="#CCFFCC"
| 2013-10-25 || Win ||align=left| Miran Fabjan || FFC08: Zelg vs. Rodriguez || Zagreb, Croatia || Decision (Split) || 3 ||3:00
|-
|-  bgcolor="#CCFFCC"
| 2013-04-13 || Win ||align=left| Ales Zavec || Enfusion Live 4 || Novo Mesto, Slovenia || Decision (Unanimous) || 3 ||3:00
|-
|-  bgcolor="#CCFFCC"
| 2012-12-09 || Win ||align=left| Ivan Stupalo || Supreme FC  || Belgrade, Serbia || Decision (Unanimous) || 3 || 3:00
|-  bgcolor="#CCFFCC"
| 2012-06-16 || Win ||align=left| Konstantin Serebrianikov  || W.A.K.O. Pro WGP Serbia vs Russia, final || Belgrade, Serbia || Decision (Majority) || 3 || 3:00
|-
! style=background:white colspan=9 |
|-
|-  bgcolor="#FFBBBB"
| 2012-03-17 || Loss || align=left| Karim Ghajji || Boxe in défi XIII, Tournament, Semi Final || Muret, France || Decision || 3 || 2:00
|-
|-  bgcolor="#FFBBBB"
| 2012-01-14 || Loss ||align=left| Khasan Khaliev  || W5  || Grozny, Russia || Decision || 5 || 3:00
|-
! style=background:white colspan=9 |
|-
|-  bgcolor="#CCFFCC"
| 2011-09-16 || Win ||align=left| Mihai Barbu || W.A.K.O. Pro WGP Romania vs Serbia, Semi Finals || Bucharest, Romania || Decision || 3 || 3:00
|-
|-  bgcolor="#FFBBBB"
| 2011-05-28 || Loss ||align=left| Frederik Fise  ||  || France || TKO (Ref. Stoppage) || 6 ||
|-
! style=background:white colspan=9 |
|-
|-  bgcolor="#FFBBBB"
| 2011-03-05 || Loss ||align=left| Nikos Papadimitriou || W.A.K.O. Pro WGP Serbia vs Greece, Quarter Finals || Belgrade, Serbia || TKO (Cut) || 2 ||
|-
|-  bgcolor="#CCFFCC"
| 2010-02-13|| Win ||align=left| Ile Risteski || Međunarodna Kick Boks Revija  || Zubin Potok, Serbia || KO || 2||
|-

|-
|-  bgcolor="#FFBBBB"
| 2013-10-03 || Loss ||align=left| James Veejaye Agathe || W.A.K.O World Championships 2013, Low-Kick Semi Finals -81 kg  || Guaruja, Brasil || Decision (Unanimous) || 3 || 2:00
|-
! style=background:white colspan=9 |
|-
|-  bgcolor="#CCFFCC"
| 2013-10-03 || Win ||align=left| Thiago Michel Pereira Silva || W.A.K.O World Championships 2013, Low-Kick Quarter Finals -81 kg  || Guaruja, Brasil || Decision (Unanimous) || 3 || 2:00
|-
|-  bgcolor="#CCFFCC"
| 2013-10-01 || Win ||align=left| Evgeny Gubar || W.A.K.O World Championships 2013, Low-Kick 1st Round -81 kg  || Guaruja, Brasil || Decision (Split) || 3 || 2:00
|-
|-  bgcolor="#CCFFCC"
| 2013-02-24 || Win ||align=left| Miljan Vidović || 4. Serbia Open Cup 2013, Final || Belgrade, Serbia || Decision (Split) || 3 ||2:00
|-
! style=background:white colspan=9 |
|-
|-  bgcolor="#CCFFCC"
| 2013-02-23 || Win ||align=left| Jasmin Musa || 4. Serbia Open Cup 2013, Semi Finals || Belgrade, Serbia || Decision (Unanimous) || 3 ||2:00
|-
|-  bgcolor="#CCFFCC"
| 2013-02-23 || Win ||align=left| Nemanja Pantelić || 4. Serbia Open Cup 2013, Quarter Finals || Belgrade, Serbia || Decision (Unanimous) || 3 ||2:00
|-
|-  bgcolor="#FFBBBB"
| 2012-11-02 || Loss ||align=left| Khasan Khaliev || W.A.K.O European Championships 2012, Low-Kick Final -75 kg || Ankara, Turkey || Decision (Unanimous) || 3 || 2:00
|-
! style=background:white colspan=9 |
|-
|-  bgcolor="#CCFFCC"
| 2012-11-01 || Win ||align=left| Sergei Alekxandrov || W.A.K.O European Championships 2012, Low-Kick Semi Finals -75 kg  || Ankara, Turkey || Decision (Unanimous) || 3 || 2:00
|-  bgcolor="#CCFFCC"
| 2012-11-01 || Win ||align=left| Oleksandr Medvedyev || W.A.K.O European Championships 2012, Low-Kick Quarter Finals -75 kg  || Ankara, Turkey || Decision (Split) || 3 || 2:00
|-  bgcolor="#CCFFCC"
| 2012-02-26 || Win ||align=left| Miljan Vidović || 3. Serbia Open Cup 2012, Final || Belgrade, Serbia || Decision (Unanimous) || 3 ||2:00
|-
! style=background:white colspan=9 |
|-
|-  bgcolor="#CCFFCC"
| 2012-02-26 || Win ||align=left| Miloš Mihaljević || 3. Serbia Open Cup 2012, Semi Finals || Belgrade, Serbia || Decision (Unanimous) || 3 ||2:00
|-
|-  bgcolor="#CCFFCC"
| 2012-02-25 || Win ||align=left| Marko Dragović || 3. Serbia Open Cup 2012, Quarter Finals || Belgrade, Serbia || Decision (Unanimous) || 3 ||2:00
|-
|-  bgcolor="#FFBBBB"
| 2011-10-29 || Loss ||align=left| Khasan Khaliev || W.A.K.O World Championships 2011, Low-Kick Final -75 kg || Skopje, Macedonia || Decision (Unanimous) || 3 || 2:00
|-
! style=background:white colspan=9 |
|-
|-  bgcolor="#CCFFCC"
| 2011-10-28 || Win ||align=left| Samba Bosar || W.A.K.O World Championships 2011, Low-Kick Semi Finals -75 kg || Skopje, Macedonia || Decision (Unanimous) || 3 || 2:00
|-  bgcolor="#CCFFCC"
| 2011-10-27 || Win ||align=left|  Bartosz Ozarek  || W.A.K.O World Championships 2011, Low-Kick Quarter Finals -75 kg || Skopje, Macedonia || Decision (Unanimous) || 3 || 2:00
|-  bgcolor="#CCFFCC"
| 2011-10-26 || Win ||align=left| Baburzhan Artykbaev || W.A.K.O World Championships 2011, Low-Kick 1st Round -75 kg || Skopje, Macedonia || Decision (Unanimous) || 3 || 2:00
|-  bgcolor="#FFBBBB"
| 2010-10 || Loss ||align=left| Samba Bosar || W.A.K.O European Championships 2010, Low-Kick Semi Finals -75 kg || Baku, Azerbaijan || Decision (Split) || 3 || 2:00
|-
! style=background:white colspan=9 |
|-
|-  bgcolor="#CCFFCC"
| 2010-10 || Win ||align=left| Andrea Andrenacci || W.A.K.O European Championships 2010, Low-Kick Semi Finals -75 kg || Baku, Azerbaijan || Decision (Unanimous) || 3 || 2:00
|-
|-  bgcolor="#CCFFCC"
| 2010-10 || Win ||align=left| Sharey Pachinsky || W.A.K.O European Championships 2010, Low-Kick Quarter Finals -75 kg || Baku, Azerbaijan || Decision (Unanimous) || 3 || 2:00
|-
|-  bgcolor="#CCFFCC"
| 2010-10 || Win ||align=left| Kamil Sharufov || W.A.K.O European Championships 2010, Low-Kick 1st Round -75 kg || Baku, Azerbaijan || Decision (Unanimous) || 3 || 2:00
|-
|-  bgcolor="#CCFFCC"
| 2010-01-31 || Win ||align=left| Mioš Mhaljević || Serbia Open Cup 2010, Final || Belgrade, Serbia || Decision (Split) || 3 || 2:00
|-
! style=background:white colspan=9 |
|-  bgcolor="#CCFFCC"
| 2010-01-30 || Win ||align=left|  Vasil Mihailov || Serbia Open Cup 2010, Semi Finals || Belgrade, Serbia || Decision (Split) || 3 || 2:00
|-  bgcolor="#CCFFCC"
| 2010-01-30 || Win ||align=left| Marjan Antić || Serbia Open Cup 2010, Quarter Finals || Belgrade, Serbia || KO || 3 ||
|-
|-
| colspan=9 | Legend:

See also 
 List of WAKO Amateur World Championships
 List of WAKO Amateur European Championships
 List of male kickboxers

References

1988 births
Living people
Serbian male kickboxers
Welterweight kickboxers
Cruiserweight kickboxers
SUPERKOMBAT kickboxers